Gen (also called Gɛ̃, Gɛn gbe, Gebe, Guin, Mina, Mina-Gen, and Popo) is a Gbe language spoken in the southeast of Togo in the Maritime Region. Like the other Gbe languages, Gen is a tonal language.

History 
The Gen-Mina originated from Accra and Elmina in Ghana. The Mina from Elmina migrated because of the Denkyira wars of aggression, while the Gen came over from Accra after their defeat in the Akwamu wars. The two groups intermingled with the indigenous Ewe, resulting in their Ewe dialect having words borrowed from Fanti, Ga-Adangbe and various European languages.

The Gen language is mutually intelligible with Ewe and is considered to be one of the many dialects of Ewe.

There were 476,000 Gen-speakers in Togo in 2019, and 130,000 in Benin in 2018.

References

Sources
Kangni, Atah-Ekoué (1989) La syntaxe du Gẽ: étude syntaxique d'un parler Gbe: le Gẽ du Sud-Togo. Frankfurt: Peter Lang.

Gbe languages
Languages of Togo
Languages of Benin